The Last Ship is a 1988 post-apocalyptic fiction novel by American writer William Brinkley.  The Last Ship tells the story of a United States Navy guided missile destroyer, the fictional USS Nathan James (DDG-80), on patrol in the Barents Sea during a brief, full-scale nuclear war between the United States and the Soviet Union. It details the ship's ensuing search for a new home for her crew.

An eponymous television series loosely based on the novel aired from 2014 to 2018 on the TNT network.

Background
The story is told in a first-person point of view by the ship's commanding officer, "Thomas", whose full name is never revealed. Thomas is writing this account several months after the war in order to describe the odyssey of his Norwegian-homeported ship, USS Nathan James (DDG-80), in the aftermath of the conflict.

Thomas begins by describing his ship to the reader. He discusses the ethics of commanding a warship, the capabilities of nuclear strike forces, daily life aboard a U.S. Navy ship in the Arctic Circle, and the nature of his ship's mission. Captain Thomas remarks that, despite the reduction in the land-based ICBM arsenal, there is still considerable power in the SLBMs and Tomahawks; his ship alone has more power than several missile silos combined.

Plot
On December 21 (year unknown), without prior warning, Thomas, the captain of the U.S. Navy destroyer, USS Nathan James (DDG-80), receives authenticated orders to carry out a nuclear strike on the Soviet city of Orel and its nearby ICBM silos. The nuclear-tipped Tomahawks are fired off in an emotionless, automated manner. Over a period of hours the crew watches them make landfall on radar and listens as the radio stations from Orel go off the air. With the mission completed, they report back to their superiors, and a reply from the U.S. Navy comes through, ordering them to break with general orders in this situation (operating under which they would proceed to the North Sea), but the message garbles to gibberish towards the end without relating their new orders. With one exception later in the book, this is the last official communication from the U.S. Navy that Nathan James ever receives.

While they can later surmise there must have been a series of major exchanges, as a simple, single exchange of 'counter-force' strikes would not account for the sheer scale of the fallout they later find, and they can also conclude other nuclear powers, like India, Pakistan, etc., have also fired at each other, the crew never learns with certainty what led to the launches or the exact sequence of events.

Thomas then decides to head southward into the North Sea and then to the United Kingdom, in order to re-establish contact with friendly forces. The ship encounters dense clouds of radioactive smoke all around Great Britain, through which can be seen the ruins of Big Ben and London.

Lacking information, the ship sets off to scout the Mediterranean coastline, counterclockwise from southern Italy to Gibraltar. Off the coast of Brittany the ship encounters a non-communicative submarine which tails them until the ship arrives off the destroyed Rock of Gibraltar, where it vanishes. Nathan James continues to scout the Mediterranean coastline, finding only masses of people suffering from radiation sickness who have fled the chaos inland. Off the coast of France, Nathan James finds a luxury sailboat with the passengers apparently killed mid-meal, suggesting the use of a neutron bomb on a coastal city. The corpse of the ship's radioman is found deeper within, along with his limited report of areas hit with nuclear weapons, painting a bleak picture for Europe, the Soviet Union, and North America. Returning to Gibraltar, the Soviet Navy ballistic missile submarine Pushkin surfaces to make direct contact.

The two vessels quickly establish a truce and agree to a joint operation. The Pushkin, fully fueled but low on food, will first scout western Africa, then attempt to reach a secret Soviet supply base in the Arctic and retrieve supplies and nuclear fuel for Nathan James. The U.S. Navy destroyer, relatively well-stocked with food but low on nuclear fuel, will scout northern Africa, then make her way to the Pacific Ocean in search of habitable land for the two crews. Thomas keeps the deal he made with the Soviet captain (trading food and a place for the Soviets in any society the Nathan James crew builds on land for nuclear fuel, if found at the Soviet base) from most of his crew, in order to not get their hopes up.

Nathan James scouts Mediterranean Africa, but strangely, despite not seeing visible direct hits, finds no people but reads radiation levels which steadily increase the farther inland any shore party ventures. Throughout, the crew salvages relatively uncontaminated farming equipment, plants, and even two goats from a small island to potentially start farming any hospitable land.

Eventually Nathan James receives a message from the National Command Authority ordering all recipients to reply. They do so, but the message repeats unaltered with machine-like precision; they conclude it is just an automated transmission. Based on his knowledge of the Soviet Union's targeting of North America, the Soviet submarine captain's report, the French radioman's report, and what he has seen of Europe, Thomas, along with most of the ship's officers, concludes that the United States has simply ceased to exist,  and what remains of North America is uninhabitable.

Many of the crew, though, wish to go home to the U.S. to see what happened. This would require them to expend most of their remaining fuel, rendering them unable to reach the Pacific to look for habitable land. If the U.S. were anything like Europe or Africa, the ship would simply be trapped. Thomas thus decides to proceed to the Pacific Ocean by way of the Suez Canal.

At Suez, the ship's Combat Systems Officer (CSO) states his belief that parts of North America may still be habitable and demands that the ship return to the U.S. East Coast, so they can see for themselves. The captain tries to discourage the CSO, but the latter challenges the captain's authority, reminding him that the U.S. Navy (under which Thomas is legally bestowed the title of captain) no longer exists, meaning Thomas is no longer in lawful command, and demands a vote on the correct course of action. Thomas, angered at this mutiny, allows a vote thinking the CSO has little support, but is shocked when nearly a third of the crew side with the CSO. The mutineers demand rafts and the captain's gig in order to sail thousands of miles to the United States. With a mixture of sadness and outrage, Thomas agrees, and the mutineers depart.

In the following weeks the ship proceeds through the Suez Canal, which is luckily open, and travels through treacherous seas in the Indian Ocean as nuclear winter begins to take full effect, with dramatic temperature drops and black snow at the equator.

They notice a pattern where the amount of fallout increases with the size of nearby landmasses. Approaching Singapore, the fallout becomes so dense that the crew cannot go onto the weather decks. Luckily, Nathan James was designed with cold weather and fallout in mind, and Thomas orders the ship hermetically sealed and people stationed on the bridge in short rotations.

Despite this, the crew suffers from mild radiation sickness, and their passage through the dense fallout becomes so trying psychologically that many crew vanish overboard. Things become even bleaker when they lose contact with the Soviet submarine, assuming she, with the nuclear fuel, was lost while scouting the Soviet coastline.

Nathan James eventually reaches the remote South Pacific and, with the ship's nuclear fuel nearly gone, discovers a small, uncontaminated island in French Polynesia. The ship's crew establishes a community on the island, and they begin to try to conceive children to continue civilization. An archival project is started, wherein everyone is encouraged to write out their knowledge for future generations.

They work out a system to allow genetic diversity with anonymous fatherhood, with the women always in strict control. However, no pregnancies occur. They worry that the radiation of the nuclear winter may have rendered everyone sterile.

Some time later, the Pushkin appears on the horizon. Its crew is on the verge of starvation but bears an abundance of nuclear fuel. Nathan James is at last free to sail again, keeping the island as its home base. They even believe the Soviet submariners, who may have been free of contamination due to being submerged, can take their place in the genetic pool.

But then a new disaster strikes: a group of the ship's sailors, abhorring the remaining nuclear missiles aboard the ship, launches them without Thomas' permission. One of the missiles accidentally detonates while in flight, triggering a chain reaction among all of the other missiles, destroying Nathan James and contaminating the island.

Thomas, his remaining crew, and the Soviet crew immediately embark aboard the Pushkin to escape, beginning a new search for another sanctuary. They eventually reach the U.S. research facility at McMurdo Station in Antarctica, which is abandoned but contains years' worth of food and supplies.

The Pushkin is modified during the escape to McMurdo Station by jettisoning its nuclear missiles into the ocean, so they can use the freed space in the silos for living space and a nursery. The introduction of the Soviet crew into the U.S. breeding program has resulted in at least three pregnancies. The Pushkin has the fuel and food from McMurdo to conduct long, thorough explorations of the world. Now well-provisioned, the survivors prepare to rediscover the world.

Reception
V.C. Royster of The Wall Street Journal compared The Last Ship to Nevil Shute's On the Beach (1957), observing The Last Ship is an "even more fascinating tale". Anthony Hyde of The Washington Post wrote, The Last Ship is "An extraordinary novel of men at war" and a "superb portrait of naval command". John R. Alden of The Cleveland Plain Dealer praised The Last Ship as "beautifully written" and a "magnificent book". Clay Reynolds of The Dallas Morning News called the book "engrossing" and a "pleasure to read". Burke Wilkinson, a U.S. naval officer, writing for The Christian Science Monitor, called The Last Ship "extraordinary" and a "true classic", saying its sum was "greater than its parts".

After the success of Sex, Lies, and Videotape, Steven Soderbergh had planned on adapting the book as his next film; however, he abandoned the project after several unsatisfactory screenplay drafts.

Television adaptation

In July 2012, the U.S. cable television network TNT ordered a pilot episode of a series based on the novel. The series is produced by Platinum Dunes Partners with Michael Bay, Hank Steinberg, and Steven Kane serving as executive producers. Steinberg and Kane wrote the pilot script, and Jonathan Mostow directed the pilot. The adaptation varies significantly from the original novel. In addition to being set in the early part of the first half of the 21st century, the worldwide devastation of mankind is the result of a pandemic for which the crew must find a cure and not the result of nuclear warfare between superpowers.

In May 2013, TNT ordered 10 episodes of The Last Ship, which aired in 2014.  A second season (of 13 episodes) was ordered in 2014 and aired in 2015, and a third season (also of 13 episodes) was ordered in 2015 and aired in 2016. A fourth season of 10 episodes aired in August 2017 and a 10-episode fifth and final season aired in September 2018.

Other adaptations
The Last Ship was released as an e-book on November 27, 2013, published by Plume.

References

1988 American novels
1988 science fiction novels
American post-apocalyptic novels
Post-apocalyptic novels
Novels set during the Cold War
Novels by William Brinkley
Novels set in Antarctica
Novels set in the Arctic
Novels set in Oceania
Viking Press books
Novels set during World War III
The Last Ship (TV series)